Alexander Oswald of Changue FRSE (1777–1821) was a 19th-century Scottish landowner and advocate.

Life

He was born in Scotstoun House near Glasgow on 1 April 1777 the fourth son of George Oswald and his wife Margaret Smythe.

Early in his life he inherited the estate of Changue in Dumfriesshire.

He studied Law and qualified as an advocate around 1800.

In 1810 he is living at 6 Duke Street (now called Dublin Street) in Edinburgh's Second New Townflat by, which was then a newly-built flat designed by William Sibbald.

In 1821 (a few months before he died) he was elected a Fellow of the Royal Society of Edinburgh his proposer being Gilbert Meason.

He died in Bath on 4 April 1821. His will is held at the National Archive in Kew.

Family

He married Miss Anne Dalrymple (d. 1820), youngest daughter of Sir Hew Dalrymple Hamilton of Bargany House[6]

Artistic Recognition
His portrait, by Andrew Geddes is held at Glasgow Museum Resource Centre.

References

1777 births
1821 deaths
Scottish lawyers
19th-century Scottish landowners
Fellows of the Royal Society of Edinburgh